Scott Hunter may refer to:
Scott Hunter (musician), vocalist with Poor Old Lu
Scott Hunter (American football) (born 1947), American football player 
Scott Hunter (Home and Away), a fictional character from the Australian soap opera Home and Away